Syllepte ogoalis is a moth in the family Crambidae. It was described by Francis Walker in 1859. It is found on Borneo and in Sri Lanka.

References

Moths described in 1859
Moths of Borneo
Moths of Sri Lanka
ogoalis
Taxa named by Francis Walker (entomologist)